Eastern Records was a subsidiary label of Sue Records, founded by Juggy Murray. In 1965, the label released the singles "The Real Thing" by Tina Britt which reached #20 on the Billboard R&B chart, and "Time Waits For No One" by Eddie & Ernie which reached #34 on the R&B chart in 1965.

Partial discography

References 

Record labels established in 1964